Orthocabera is a genus of moths in the family Geometridae.

Species
Orthocabera cymodegma (Prout, 1929)
Orthocabera fuscolineata (Swinhoe, 1894)
Orthocabera luteifrons (Swinhoe, 1894)
Orthocabera minor (West, 1929)
Orthocabera moupinaria (Oberthur, 1911)
Orthocabera obliqua (Hampson, 1893)
Orthocabera ocernaria (Swinhoe, 1893)
Orthocabera opalescens (West, 1929)
Orthocabera sericea Butler, 1879
Orthocabera similaria (Swinhoe, 1915)
Orthocabera sublavata (Prout, 1929)
Orthocabera subvitrea (Hampson, 1895)
Orthocabera tinagmaria (Guenée, 1858)

References

Abraxini